Same-sex marriage in Prince Edward Island has been legal since July 20, 2005. The Canadian province began the process of updating its laws to recognize same-sex marriage after the passage of the Civil Marriage Act in the House of Commons of Canada. Prince Edward Island had been one of only four provinces and territories, with Alberta, the Northwest Territories and Nunavut, where same-sex marriage had not already been legalized by court challenges prior to the passage of the law.

Background
On December 10, 2004, Premier Pat Binns said that his government would wait for federal legislation to resolve the issue. It is unclear how Binns would have reacted if a provincial court had found the heterosexual definition of marriage in violation of the Charter rights of gays and lesbians. A spokeswoman for a local LGBT group said in June 2005 that the province should legalize same-sex marriage "right away", noting that the island often lacked behind the rest of Canada on the issue of LGBT rights, "It's also sad to think in a province that could actually lead, on this particular issue, that they choose to stand by and wait for the federal government to make the decision. Thereby not having anyone in government make the commitment to these human rights issues."

Civil Marriage Act
After the House of Commons of Canada passed the Civil Marriage Act in June 2005, provincial Attorney General Mildred Dover announced that the province would bring provincial legislation in line with the law, "We have said all along that we would comply if the federal government passed same-sex legislation. They have the power to define marriage. We're looking at the possibility of bringing in an omnibus bill that would say something to the effect of wherever the word spouse appears in our legislation, it includes same-sex and heterosexual marriages." The Act passed through the Canadian Senate on July 19 and received royal assent the next day on July 20, 2005, extending same-sex marriage rights across all of Canada.

However, Ms. Dover announced that marriage licences would not be issued to same-sex couples until the province's laws were updated. This was different from how the process had worked in other provinces; in those where courts called for same-sex marriage, and in Alberta after the Civil Marriage Act was passed. On July 22, Prince Edward Island was the only remaining province in the country where same-sex couples could not marry in practice. Dover said, "We'll do it as quickly as we can. We didn't prepare beforehand because, if we had prepared and changed all the wording, then people would say 'Why did you do that when it hadn't passed?'" Complaints immediately arose charging that the delay imposed by the province was illegal and violated the legal rights of same-sex couples. In response to these complaints, the province reversed its position. The first same-sex couple to wed on Prince Edward Island were Dr. Chris Zarow and Constance Majeau on August 20, 2005 in Vernon Bridge, as reported by the Charlottetown Guardian. Reverend Barry King officiated at the ceremony. He said: "Today we celebrate the beginning of a journey for Connie and Chris. This journey is filled with joy because it's filled with love. Connie and Chris chose this path because they love each other."

Provincial legislation
In May 2008, provincial law was finally brought in line with the federal legislation. A bill amending the Marriage Act, the Adoption Act and several other acts regarding family law was passed by the Legislative Assembly of Prince Edward Island and given royal assent by Lieutenant Governor Barbara Oliver Hagerman. The law replaced references to "husband and wife" with the gender-neutral term "spouses", and the Adoption Act was amended to allow married same-sex couples to adopt children jointly. The law took effect on 19 December 2009.

Prince Edward Island legislation also recognises cohabitation agreements which can be entered into by two people who live together but are not married to each other. It is a written agreement recognised by the provincial Family Law Act that sets out rights and responsibilities for common-law partners. The agreement provides partners with some, but not all, of the rights and benefits of marriage. Common-law partners have the same rights to spousal support as married couples, and child support and custody. However, common-law couples are treated very different to married spouses with regards to inheritance and property rights. They have no right to inheritance if the partner were to die, and do not have the right to division of property or to stay in the common home upon separation or the death of the partner.

Marriage statistics
The 2016 Canadian census showed that there were 230 same-sex couples living in Prince Edward Island.

Religious performance
In July 2019, the synod of the Anglican Church of Canada passed a resolution known as "A Word to the Church", allowing its dioceses to choose whether to perform same-sex marriages. In September of the same year, Bishop Ron Cutler of the Diocese of Nova Scotia and Prince Edward Island issued a pastoral letter allowing local parishes to perform same-sex marriages.

Public opinion
A 2017 CROP poll showed that 78% of respondents in Atlantic Canada supported same-sex marriage, but did not give a figure for each Atlantic province individually. Nationwide, 74% of Canadians found it "great that in Canada, two people of the same sex can get married", while 26% disagreed.

See also
Same-sex marriage in Canada
LGBT rights in Canada

References

External links

Prince Edward Island
Prince Edward Island law
2005 in LGBT history